The Abruzzo regional election of 1975 took place on 15 June 1975.

Events
Christian Democracy was by far the largest party, while the Italian Communist Party came distantly second.

After the election Christian Democrat Felice Spadaccini was elected President of the Region, but was replaced by partymate Romeo Ricciuti in 1977.

Results

Source: Ministry of the Interior

Elections in Abruzzo
1975 elections in Italy
June 1975 events in Europe